The Plenipotentiary Conference (PP) is the supreme organ of the International Telecommunication Union (ITU), it is a treaty-making conference. It is composed of all 193 ITU Member states and meets every four years.

The Conference determines the policies, direction and activities of the ITU, as well as electing the members of other ITU organs, and positions at the secretariat, namely the Secretary-General, the Deputy Secretary-General, and the Directors of the Radiocommunication, Standardization, and Development Bureaux.

Sessions

PP-14 
The 2014 Plenipotentiary Conference (PP-14) was held 20 October to 7 November 2014 in Busan (Republic of Korea).

PP-18 
The 2018 Plenipotentiary Conference (PP-18) was held from 29 October until 16 November in Dubai (United Arab Emirates). The conference elected the following ITU officers at the secretariat:

 Secretary-General: Houlin Zhao (2nd term)
 Deputy Secretary-General: Malcolm Johnson (2nd term)
 Director of the Radiocommunication Bureau: Mario Maniewicz (1st term)
 Director of the Standardization Bureau: Chaesub Lee (2nd term)
 Director of the Development Bureau: Doreen Bogdan-Martin (1st term)

PP-22 
The 2022 Plenipotentiary Conference (PP-22) was held from 26 September until 8 October in Bucharest, Romania. It elected Doreen Bogdan-Martin to serve as ITU Secretary General  and Tomas Lamanauskas to serve as ITU Deputy Secretary-General for 2023-2026. Mario Maniewicz (of Uruguay) was elected for a second term. Seizo Onoe (of Japan) was elected Director of the Telecommunication Standardization Bureau (the Secretariat of ITU-T).

References